Rusescu is a Romanian surname. Notable people with the surname include:

Alfred Rusescu (1895–1981), Romanian pediatrician
Maria Rusescu (born 1936), Romanian painter
Raul Rusescu (born 1988), Romanian footballer

Romanian-language surnames